"Love Me" is a song by American rapper Lil Wayne featuring Canadian rapper Drake and fellow American rapper Future from the former's tenth studio album I Am Not a Human Being II (2013). Written by the artists alongside producers Mike WiLL Made It and A+, it was released on January 18, 2013 by Young Money Entertainment, Cash Money Records, and Republic Records as the second single from the album.  It also appeared for free download on the Rich Gang mixtape Rich Gang: Allstars.

The song became a top ten hit, peaking at number nine on the US Billboard Hot 100 and becoming Lil Wayne's 18th top ten single on that chart. It also became Future's first top 10 hit and most successful single until "Mask Off," which peaked at number five on the Billboard Hot 100 in May, 2017.

Background
The song leaked online in late December 2012, after Cash Money’s DJ E-Feezy premiered I Am Not a Human Being IIs lead single on December 29, 2012. The artwork for the single was made by Kanye West's creative content company, DONDA. On January 30, 2013, an animated version of the cover was released.

On December 23, 2013, Mike WiLL Made It released his mixtape, #MikeWillBeenTrill, which featured the original version of "Love Me" with only Future and Drake, with two verses by Future.

Music video 
The music video was directed by Hannah Lux Davis and shot on January 30, 2013, in Los Angeles. The teaser trailer was released on February 12, 2013. The music video premiered on February 14, 2013, on MTV Jams. It currently has over 441 million views on YouTube.

Charts

Weekly charts

Year-end charts

Sales and certifications

Release history

References

2013 songs
2013 singles
Cash Money Records singles
Lil Wayne songs
Future (rapper) songs
Drake (musician) songs
Songs written by Lil Wayne
Songs written by Drake (musician)
Song recordings produced by Mike Will Made It
Music videos directed by Hannah Lux Davis
Songs written by Future (rapper)
Songs written by Mike Will Made It
Songs written by Asheton Hogan
Songs about drugs